Ainars Zvirgzdiņš (born March 2, 1959) is a Latvian basketball coach, mostly known with the Latvia women's national basketball team. He competed with the team at the 2008 Summer Olympics and Eurobasket Women 2007.

References

1959 births
Living people
Latvian basketball coaches
People from Sabile
Soviet basketball coaches